"Tell Him No" is a 1959 song by Travis and Bob and was the only Top 40 hit for the duo in the United States while peaking at #1 in Canada and the Netherlands. The song also reached #1 in the Netherlands with cover versions by Dean and Marc, The Mudlarks and The Fouryo's.

Background
"Tell Him No" was written about a boy telling a girl to watch out for another boy interested in her.

Recording
"Tell Him No" was planned to be the B-side for Travis and Bob's cover of "All I Have to Do Is Dream" by The Everly Brothers. However, after performing for record producer Henry Bailey in Mobile, Alabama, the duo were offered a record deal. Travis and Bob recorded the track in Gulfport, Mississippi for Sandy Records.

Acquisition
In March 1959, Dot Records bought the distribution rights for "Tell Him No" from Sandy Records for $12,000. Cameo Records and Liberty Records also competed for the rights of the single.

Reception
Billboard predicted Travis and Bob's version of "Tell Him No" would become a future hit.

Chart performance
In the United States, Travis and Bob's version of "Tell Him No" charted at #8 on the Billboard Hot 100 while a cover by Dean and Marc reached #42. Other non-charting covers in the US include a Bigtop recording by The Jackson Brothers and Margie Rayburn's rendition of the song produced for Liberty but later retracted. 

Outside of the United States, non-charting covers of "Tell Him No" were released in Australia by The Unichords for W&G and Ted & Ray for HMV. Alternatively, "Tell Him No" reached #1 in the Netherlands for Travis and Bob alongside covers by Dean and Marc, The Mudlarks and The Fouryo's, which was released under the name "Zeg niet nee".

Charts

Travis & Bob version

Dean & Marc version

The Fouryo's version

The Mudlarks version

See also
 List of number-one singles of 1959 (Canada)

References

1959 singles
Number-one singles in Canada
1959 songs